Vernolepin is a sesquiterpene lactone isolated from the dried fruit of Vernonia amygdalina. It shows platelet anti-aggregating properties and is also an irreversible DNA polymerase inhibitor, hence may have antitumor properties.

References

Sesquiterpene lactones
Secondary alcohols
Alkene derivatives
DNA polymerase inhibitors